Barataria is a town in Trinidad and Tobago. It is east of Port of Spain and Laventille and west of San Juan. It is part of the East–West Corridor.

Cityscape
Barataria falls under the San Juan–Laventille Regional Corporation. It is a relatively quiet residential area, home to retired and "middle classes" with streets running north–south and east–west with corresponding names, e.g. "Fifth Street". There is the usual suburban mix of churches, shops, bars and auto repair shops. It is not far from the main highways into Port of Spain direct or via the scenic Lady Young Road, and the East–West Corridor. Busy shopping areas are within walking distance. The busy bus route (maxi-taxis abound) running parallel with the eastbound highway runs next to fifth street in Barataria and the Eastern Main Road runs between second and third streets. The bus route was originally built to provide access to and from Piarco International Airport in case of a national emergency.

Notable people
 Fitzroy Hoyte, cyclist
 Angela Hunte, singer
 Heather Headley, Grammy Award and Tony Award winning singer
 Aditi Soondarsingh, chess player

Gallery

References

External links

Populated places in Trinidad and Tobago